Alexandre Bengué (born 22 December 1975, in Lourdes) is a French rally driver. Bengué was a factory driver for Škoda Motorsport in the World Rally Championship in 2005, before scoring two points finishes as a privateer in 2006.

Career
Bengué began his rally career in 1998 when he won the Volant Rally Jeunes competition organised by the Fédération Française du Sport Automobile (FFSA). In 2002 he began competing in the French Rally Championship in a Peugeot 206 WRC, winning one round. In the following year he won four rounds on the way to being crowned French Asphalt Rally Champion. He also took part in the Tour de Corse in a Peugeot 206 WRC, but was forced to retire with a mechanical issue.

In 2004 he again won four French championship rounds, but missed out on the title finishing second. He took part in two WRC rounds, finishing tenth on Rallye Deutschland but again having to retire while running eighth overall. In November he was announced as a driver for the factory Škoda Motorsport team for the 2005 season. He would driving the team's second car on asphalt events.

He finished ninth on his debut with the team on the Monte Carlo Rally, taking two stage victories on the second day. His next outing for the team came in Germany, but he retired after going off the road on the third stage. His third start for the team was on his home round in Corsica, where he finished in sixth place, matching the best ever result for the Škoda Fabia WRC. His fourth and final rally for the team was on Rally Catalunya, but he was forced to retire. Škoda Motorsport withdrew from the WRC at the end of 2005.

For 2006 Bengué entered the Catalunya and Corsica rounds in a Peugeot 307 WRC for the BSA team. He finished fourth overall in Spain, and then finished fifth in France.

In 2008 Bengué returned to the French championship and won two rounds in a 307 WRC.

In 2010 Bengué was announced to be part of a five-round Intercontinental Rally Challenge programme with British firm Motor Sports Developments and tyre firm Hankook in an Opel Corsa OPC Super 2000. They were forced to retire from their first rally in Ypres on the first stage due to engine damage. Bengué never competed in the car again.

Complete World Rally Championship results

References

External links
Official website
Career results at eWRC-results.com
Career results at RallyBase

1975 births
People from Lourdes
Living people
World Rally Championship drivers
Intercontinental Rally Challenge drivers
French rally drivers
Sportspeople from Hautes-Pyrénées
Škoda Motorsport drivers